Associação Ferroviária de Esportes, commonly referred to as simply Ferroviária, is a Brazilian association football club in Araraquara, São Paulo. They currently play in the Série D, the fourth tier of Brazilian football, as well as in the Campeonato Paulista, São Paulo's premier state league. 

Founded on April 12, 1950, Ferroviária is the only Araraquara club to reach the Campeonato Paulista first division. The club's best campaign in that competition was in 1959, when the club finished in the third position. It is also the only club of the city to have competed in the Campeonato Brasileiro Série B. The club competed in this competition in 1995.

They play in carmine shirts, white shorts and socks.

History
The club was founded on April 12, 1950, by engineers of Estrada de Ferro Araraquara (meaning Araraquara Railroad). Antônio Tavares Pereira Lima was chosen as the club's first president. Initially the club's colors were to be blue and white, like the Rio de Janeiro city team. However, these colors were not very popular, and were changed to carmine and white, like the Juventus ones.

On May 13, 1951, the club played their first match ever. The club beat Mogiana of Campinas 3–1. The club's first goal was scored by Fordinho in that match. On May 20, 1951, the club played their second match, in Taquaritinga city. It was also the club's first defeat. Linense, of Lins, beat Ferroviária 2–1. On June 10, 1951, Ferroviária's stadium, called Estádio Fonte Luminosa, was inaugurated. In the inaugural match, Vasco da Gama, of Rio de Janeiro, beat Ferroviária 5–0. On July 1, 1951, Ferroviária played their first match against a club from the same city. Ferroviária was defeated by Paulista (Araraquara) 4–0.

On April 15, 1956, Ferroviária beat Botafogo of Ribeirão Preto 6–3 in the Campeonato Paulista Second Division final stage (disputed by eight teams playing against each other twice), and won the title and the promotion to the following year's first division. In the last match of the competition, Ferroviária beat Portuguesa Santista 5–4.

In 1983, Ferroviária competed in the Brazilian Série A, finishing in the 12th position. In 1994, the club was the runner-up of the Brazilian Série C, after losing to Novorizontino 1–0 in the first leg, at home, and 5–0 in the second leg, in Novo Horizonte. The club was promoted to the following year's second division.

From 1994 until 1996, the Ferroviária participated in the top division of São Paulo state championship, having Otavio Augusto (Otavio Braga) as their topscore in 1994 with 8 goals and in 1996 with 6 goals.

Current squad (2018)

Achievements
Copa Paulista: 2
2006, 2017

Campeonato Paulista Série A2: 3
1955, 1966, 2015

Campeonato Brasileiro Série C: 0
Runners-up (1): 1994

Copa do Brasil de Futebol Feminino: 1
2014

Stadium

Ferroviária plays their matches at Estádio Fonte Luminosa, inaugurated in 1951, with a maximum capacity of 18,453 people.

Mascot
The club's mascot is a locomotive.

Women's team

The women's team won the 2014 Campeonato Brasileiro de Futebol Feminino as well as the 2014 Copa do Brasil de Futebol Feminino.

References

External links
Ferroviária S/A Araraquara official website

 Fansite 2

 
Football clubs in São Paulo (state)
Association football clubs established in 1950
1950 establishments in Brazil
Railway association football teams